The Oldsmobile Cutlass Supreme is a mid-size car produced by Oldsmobile between 1966 and 1997. It was positioned as a premium offering at the top of the Cutlass range. It began as a trim package, developed its own roofline, and rose during the mid-1970s to become not only the most popular Oldsmobile but the highest selling model in its class.

It was produced as a rear-wheel drive two-door hardtop, sedan, and station wagon into the 1980s, and a convertible through 1972.  In 1988 Oldsmobile sought to capitalize on the brand equity of the Cutlass Supreme marque by replacing it with a downsized front-wheel drive model based on the GM10 platform W-platform.

When production ended there was no direct replacement for the Cutlass Supreme, although the Intrigue introduced for 1998 was designed in size and price to replace all the Cutlass models.

First generation (1966–1967)

The Cutlass Supreme name first appeared for the 1966 model year, the first year of GM's new intermediate four-door hardtop sedan—also known as the Holiday Sedan. In addition to the new body style (also available on the midline F-85 Deluxe series), the Supreme featured a plusher interior that included a bench seat with armrest, full wheel covers and deluxe door panels among other items including "CS" emblems on the rear C-pillars and trunk lid. Although smaller than the traditional domestic cars, "its deluxe interior makes it comparable with LTD, VIP, DPL, and Caprice."
 
For the 1967 model year, the Cutlass Supreme line was expanded into a full series that also included a two-door hardtop coupe (Holiday Coupe), two-door pillared coupe (Sport Coupe), four-door pillared sedan (Town Sedan) and a convertible. Generally, interior appointments in Supreme models were more luxurious than lesser F-85 and Cutlass series cars and included a cloth or "Morocceen" vinyl bench seat with armrest in sedan models and all-vinyl Strato bucket seats in coupes and convertibles.

Transmission offerings included a standard three-speed manual with column shift, floor-mounted four-speed manual with Hurst shifter or a two-speed Jetaway automatic.

In 1967, the high-performance 442 package with the   V8 was available on three Cutlass Supreme models including the sport coupe, Holiday coupe and convertible. Also available on each of those three Supreme two-door models was "Turnpike Cruiser" option that included a 400 cubic-inch V8 with two-barrel carburetor and  rating along with a numerically lower rear axle and Turbo Hydramatic transmission.

Second generation (1968–1972)

The Cutlass Supreme, now the top-line Olds intermediate series, was pared down to two- and four-door hardtop models with the pillared sedans and coupes dropped and the convertible moved to the lower-priced Cutlass "S" line, upon which the 4-4-2 muscle car was now based.

The 1969 models received only a minor facelift such as a new split grille and vertical taillights with the same model and engine offerings. A new three-speed Turbo Hydra-matic 350 was added to the option list to replace the two-speed Jetaway automatic. Headrests were made standard equipment due to federal safety mandate and the ignition switch moved from the instrument panel to the steering column, which also was designed to lock the steering wheel. This ignition/steering wheel interlock, found on all 1969-model General Motors passenger cars, except for the Corvair, debuted one year before the federal government mandated it on all 1970 models.

For 1970, the Cutlass Supreme nameplate was switched to Oldsmobile's equivalent of the downsized Pontiac Grand Prix on the A-body, to give the division an entry in the burgeoning market for smaller personal luxury cars. As such, the two-door hardtop had a new notchback roofline, while lower trim-line Cutlass coupes had a fastback style roof. The model remained in this role for virtually all of its production life. Unlike the Grand Prix and the also-related Chevrolet Monte Carlo, which had wholly separate bodies, longer wheelbases and different names from their less expensive siblings, the Supreme shared front and rear body parts with the standard Cutlass line and was always marketed as part of it. In addition to the two-door hardtop (Holiday Coupe), the Cutlass Supreme series for 1970 also included a four-door hardtop (Holiday Sedan) and regained the convertible bodystyle.

Supreme interiors were more luxurious that those of other Cutlass models, with a choice of a Custom Sport notchback bench seat with armrest in Osborne cloth or Morocceen vinyl or, at no extra cost (on coupes and convertibles only), Strato bucket seats in Morocceen vinyl. Available at extra cost with the bucket seats was a center console with floor-mounted shifter for which the Turbo Hydra-Matic transmission could also be had with the Hurst Dual-Gate shifter commonly found in the division's musclecar, the Oldsmobile 442.

For 1970 and 1971, both the Cutlass Supreme coupe and convertible were available with the Code Y-79 high performance "SX" option package. The SX option included several versions of the larger 455 cubic-inch Rocket V8 borrowed from the Olds 442 along with the cutout rear bumper and exhaust trumpets, 442's rallye suspension (optional), distinctive SX badges and other features.

A W31 option added distinctive stripes and badging, and a camshaft with increased lift and duration for the 350 engine. The W31 option was offered on Supreme coupes only in 1968, but continued on lower-line F-85 and Cutlass S coupes through 1970.

1972 was the only year in which the Cutlass Supreme notchback hardtop could be equipped with the L75 455 and M20 four speed transmission, and only 77 of these cars were produced. All 1972 L75 455/M20 cars used the larger 2.07 valves and the W30 automatic camshaft. This gave the L75 455/M20 cars 270 net horsepower, as opposed to the TH400 automatic-equipped L75 cars, which produced 250 net horsepower.

The 1972 Hurst/Olds was based on the Supreme two-door hardtop and convertible, powered by both versions of the 455 Rocket offered on the 4-4-2, along with a Turbo 400 transmission with Hurst Dual/Gate shifter. The H/O convertible also served as the Indianapolis 500 Pace Car in 1972.

1972 was also the final year for Olds to offer the Cutlass Supreme convertible, until 1990.  In its final year, it was the best-selling convertible in the U.S., with 11,571 sold, or 16% of the market, beating the Eldorado and Corvette. From 1973 to 1975, the only Oldsmobile convertible offered was the full-sized Delta 88 Royale.

Third generation (1973–1977)

In 1973, the Cutlass Supreme, like other GM mid-size cars, was redesigned. Hardtop models were replaced by new "Colonnade" styling with fixed center pillars. Concerns over proposed rollover standards caused many automakers to phase out their pillarless hardtops and convertibles throughout the 1970s, and the Cutlass was no exception. Despite some initial controversy over the disappearance of hardtop models, the new 1973 GM mid-sized line proved highly successful. Cutlass Supreme coupes had a unique roofline with vertical opera windows not shared with other Cutlass coupes, as well as unique front end styling.

The Cutlass line soon became Oldsmobile's biggest seller, accounting for 43% of the division's total volume in 1974, with the Cutlass Supreme coupe being the single most popular model. With rectangular headlights newly legalized in 1975, the Cutlass received a facelift for the 1976 model year featuring quad headlights and a waterfall grille. This attractive redesign boosted sales even further. The Cutlass line as a whole was America's best-selling car in 1976, helping Oldsmobile to become the only marque outside of Ford and Chevrolet to break one-million units sold. By 1977, however, GM had downsized its full-size models, and the Cutlass Supreme was now nearly identical in size to the redesigned Delta 88. That situation would last only that one year, as GM planned to downsize the Olds Cutlass and other intermediates for 1978.

In addition to the Colonnade hardtop coupe, the Cutlass Supreme was also offered in a four-door Colonnade sedan (with six-window styling and frameless door windows) as well as six-and-nine passenger station wagons - the wagons with the woodgrain exterior trim were marketed under the Vista Cruiser nameplate previously used on Oldsmobile's stretched-wheelbase station wagons with raised roof and skylights from 1964 to 1972 while the Cutlass Supreme Cruiser was offered with the same equipment and dimensions without the woodgrained appearance.

The Supreme Colonnade sedan was available in 1973 as the Cutlass Salon, which was an option package that included radial tires, upgraded suspension and reclining bucket seats upholstered in corduroy or vinyl trim along with color-keyed wheelcovers - designed as sort of a European-style luxury/touring sedan similar to the Pontiac Grand Am of the same period. For 1974, the Salon package was also made available on the Supreme Colonnade coupe and in 1975, the Salon was upgraded to a separate series available in both sedan and coupe. The 1975s received a new, more squared off grille, slightly larger and incorporating parking lights. The bumpers also continued to grow ever larger.

Both three- and four-speed manual transmissions were offered in 1973, but the greatest majority of Cutlasses (including Supremes) were built with the three-speed Turbo Hydra-matic automatic transmission which became standard equipment in 1974, along with variable-ratio power steering.

The 1973-74 energy crisis resulting from the Arab Oil Embargo led Oldsmobile to introduce two new smaller engines to the Cutlass line in 1975. The Chevrolet built 250 cubic-inch inline six and three-speed manual transmission were reinstated as standard equipment on the Supreme coupe and sedan with a new Olds-built 260 cubic-inch Rocket V8 (standard on Cutlass Salon and optional on all other Cutlasses except wagons) offered as an option. However, the majority of Cutlass Supremes in 1975, 1976, and 1977 were sold with the now-optional 350 Rocket V8 and Turbo Hydra-matic automatic (still standard on wagons). The 455 Rocket V8 was optional through 1976, and replaced by a smaller 403 Rocket V8 in 1977, the same year in which a Buick-built 231 cubic-inch V6 replaced the Chevy inline six as base power in most Cutlass models.

For 1976, the Cutlass Supreme Brougham coupe was added to the line, featuring a more luxurious interior trim than the regular Supreme model with pillowed crushed velour upholstery and 60/40 bench seats similar to the larger Ninety-Eight Regency. It also received quad square headlights. For 1977, the Brougham was also available as a four-door Colonnade sedan. The grille was also changed, with each half divided into five rather than two segments of bars divided by chrome strips.

A five-speed manual transmission was available as an option with the 260 V8 in all models except Supreme Brougham and station wagons for 1976-77.

Fourth generation (1978–1988)

The Cutlass Supreme was downsized for 1978, along with the rest of the Cutlass line. An upscale Cutlass Calais model was added, differing from the Cutlass Supreme only in minor trim details. The new notchback Cutlass Supreme proved to be far more popular than the controversial fastback Cutlass Salon coupe and sedan introduced at the same time.

The Cutlass Calais, essentially replaced the previous Cutlass Salon series, as far as model position and content were concerned. The Calais featured reclining Strato bucket seats, center console, sport steering wheel, full instrumentation, tuned suspension with front and rear sway bars, color-keyed wheelcovers, front grilles mimicking an ice cube tray (as opposed to the waterfall style used with the Cutlass Supreme) and more.

Both the Cutlass Supreme and Calais were available with T-tops or a factory sunroof, even on the base Cutlass Supreme coupe with the factory radio delete option.

From 1978 through 1980, a high-performance 442 model was available, and for 1979 (Cutlass Calais), a special-edition performance model, the Hurst/Olds was offered. These used the Supreme's notchback body, rather than the standard fastback coupe's.  Around 2,499 Hurst/Olds were produced - all were powered with an Oldsmobile 5.7L (350 cubic-inch) Rocket V8 (not the diesel engine) sourced from the full-sized Delta 88 and Ninety Eight Regency. Also included in the Hurst/Olds package was the Hurst Dual/Gate shifter for the three-speed Turbo Hydra-matic transmission.

In 1978, the Cutlass line featured taillights which had a lighted  Oldsmobile rocket logo in the center.

In 1979, the taillights on the Cutlass line dropped the rocket logo.

In 1980, the two-door models went back to four headlights. A 4-door notchback sedan (known as Cutlass, Cutlass LS, and Cutlass Brougham) replaced the unpopular 4-door "aeroback" Salon, which continued in two-door form for one more year. The Supreme Brougham package was available on and off throughout 1978-1988 production.  This was also the first year GM introduced the OBD-I computer controlled engine management and emission control system.

The 442 option moved from the aeroback Cutlass Salon coupe body to the notchback Cutlass Calais for 1980, with content upgraded from a mere "appearance and handling" package back to a legitimate performance option with content similar to the 1979 Hurst/Olds including its 350 Rocket V8. This would be the last 442 until that model was revived in 1985 again on the Cutlass notchback body as a successor to the 1983–84 Hurst/Olds.

In 1981, the Cutlass Supreme coupe received an aerodynamic restyle (with a "shovel-nose" front header panel), which, along with a higher rear deck, decreased air resistance by 15%. It would continue with this basic design until the final rear-drive Cutlass was produced in 1988. A 4-door sedan was added to the Supreme lineup, with a new front end and a slight taillight lens restyle (resembling a touch-tone dial or Rubik's Cube - this lens style was used until 1984).  It was this restyled body that (along with the Chevrolet Monte Carlo, Buick Regal, and Pontiac Grand Prix) ushered in the downsized cars into NASCAR cup competition.  While the Cutlass looked almost identical to the Buick Regal (which scored 35+ victories in the 1981 thru 1985 seasons), the Cutlass (like the Dodge Mirada) didn't take one checkered flag, and many teams moved away from it in 1983 to the Regal, Grand Prix, and restyled Monte Carlo SS.  This was a rude awakening to Oldsmobile, which was getting used to wins on the NASCAR circuit.

In 1982 GM introduced the front-wheel drive A-body as the volume replacement for the 1978-vintage RWD A-bodies. Oldsmobile launched the FWD Cutlass Ciera, but lower gas prices and strong sales allowed them to continue sales of the older RWD Cutlass Supreme as a premium model until 1988. (The older body was renamed to be the G-Body.)

The Hurst/Olds reappeared on the Cutlass Calais coupe for two years, first in 1983 as the black over silver 15th anniversary, and then as the silver over black 1984 model. Both featured chrome wheels, red striping and a high output Oldsmobile 307 V8 with 4 barrel carburetor, dual muffler exhausts and Hurst's then new three stick Lightning Rods shifter (the latter eventually becoming a magnet for thieves.) All Hurst/Olds were automatics.

The Cutlass Cruiser stationwagon nameplate was moved to the Cutlass Ciera in 1984.

The 1985 Cutlass Supreme was produced by Oldsmobile and designed after the Oldsmobile Calais, which became a separate model on the GM N platform in the same year. The rear-wheel drive Cutlass Calais was renamed the Cutlass Salon (taking its name from the upscale Supreme coupe and sedan that preceded the Calais).

“ 5.0-liter V8 engine, available. The added performance that adds to the pleasure of driving.” The Olds Cutlass Supreme coupe and sedan were stock with a 3.8-liter V6, 2 barrel engine, while a 5-liter V8 engine was available at extra cost.

Brougham Coupe and Sedan - Although very similar to the original Cutlass Supreme, the Brougham is slightly better equipped. It has the same exact 3.8-liter stock engine and 3-speed transmission, but has a divided front bench seat with individual controls and the choice of velour trim in five colors. Also includes a convenience group with lamps, visor vanity mirror and chime tones. To finish off the specialization of the premium model, Oldsmobile created specific Brougham hood ornaments.

1987 was the final year for the rear-wheel drive sedan, and both coupe models received a restyled header panel with composite headlights.  A Buick 231 was the base motor alongside the Oldsmobile 307. For its final year, the 442 package was moved to the Supreme model.

1988 was the final year for the rear-wheel drive Cutlass Supreme. It was badged Cutlass Supreme Classic, and 27,678 were built. The 2-door coupe (produced alongside the Chevrolet Monte Carlo at GM's Pontiac, Michigan plant) continued, until the new front-wheel drive version was released in December 1987. The Olds 307 was the only available engine.

High-performance engines
Two high-performance variants were created, both using a high-output version of Oldsmobile's 5.0 L (307 CID) V8 engine:
 1983–1984 Oldsmobile Hurst/Olds
 1985–1987 Oldsmobile 442

Fifth generation (1988–1997)

A front-wheel-drive Cutlass Supreme based on the GM10 platform (W-body) was introduced as a 2-door notchback coupe mid-year during the 1988 production run, while the final year of Cutlass Supreme RWD coupes were still being produced.  This new FWD model shared its  wheelbase with the Pontiac Grand Prix, Buick Regal, and later Chevrolet Lumina.  The 1988 and 1989 models were 2-door coupes.  This body style proved to be a winner for NASCAR competition and it visited the victory circle 13 times between 1989 and 1992, when Oldsmobile ended its racing program. A 4-door notchback sedan and a 2-door convertible were added for 1990.  Models included base (later called S), SL, and the sporty International Series.  Throughout its run, the convertible was especially popular and considered a separate trim level.

International Series models could be equipped with unique features such as quad bucket seats with dual center consoles, a driver information system and a heads-up display.  A very rare Muncie 5-speed manual transmission option was paired first with the  60° V6 in 1988 and 1989.  In 1990, a revised Getrag 5-speed manual transmission option was available for the high-output Quad-4 I4 and the DOHC  60° V6 in 1991 and 1992.  The entire line was restyled for 1992, with coupes and convertibles gaining distinctive "mini-quad" headlamps shared with the Pontiac Grand Prix coupe.  A driver's side airbag became standard in 1994, and a new ergonomically curved dashboard with dual airbags debuted in 1995.

The trim levels and the lineup were gradually pared down over time.  The Quad-4 was last produced during the 1991 model year; the manual transmission option during 1992; the International Series during 1993; the S model during 1994; the convertible during 1995; and the 3.4 L V6 engine option during 1996.  The Cutlass Supreme ceased production at the end of the 1997 model year.  That same year, an N-body Cutlass (actually a badge-engineered Malibu) was introduced to replace the Ciera, but this model lasted just three years.  The Cutlass Supreme's place in the Oldsmobile line was taken by the 1998 Intrigue, built on the next version of the W platform. The Cutlass Supreme ended production on April 24, 1997.

The W-body Cutlass Supreme was built in Doraville, Georgia from 1988 to 1995, and at the Fairfax Plant in Kansas City, Kansas from 1996 to 1997.  The first 1988 Cutlass Supreme rolled off the assembly line on January 13, 1988. The last Cutlass Supreme convertible was completed on February 15, 1995. The reason for this is that the last 34,743 cars built in Doraville were sedans, the coupe production was sent to Fairfax, Kansas around March 1, 1995, and Cars and Concepts did not have a facility near Fairfax.

Indianapolis 500 Pace Car
In 1988 the Indianapolis Motor Speedway chose Oldsmobile to pace “The Greatest Spectacle in Racing”, with retired United States Air Force General Chuck Yeager behind the wheel. Traditionally a manufacturer builds many pace car replicas, often thousands. But in 1988 Oldsmobile chose to build only 50 Cutlass Convertible Indy Pace Car editions. All 50 (used on track on race day and in 500 Festival activities) were essentially hand-built. General Motors/Oldsmobile contracted Cars and Concepts of Brighton, Michigan to build each of these 50 unique cars. Following the race 50 very select Oldsmobile dealers were given the opportunity to purchase one of these cars. The price was set at full invoice price for a standard International Series coupe (~$14,000) plus the cost of the convertible conversion (an additional $13,997). Each was highly optioned, including the first-ever application of Heads Up Display in an American production vehicle developed by Hughes Electronics. After the 50 were in the dealers' hands across the country, General Motors discovered some issue with the certification of these one-off models. Each dealer was asked to return them to GM (where they were to be destroyed) and receive full credit of their purchase price. Most of the 50 were returned for credit, but a few dealers objected and kept their cars, leaving (by all accounts) less than 10 in the general population. Mr. Thomas Knobloch, a second-generation Oldsmobile dealer in Erie, Pennsylvania was one of those dealers who refused to relinquish his car. He instead held on to it as a collectible. The Knobloch family sold the car after his death.

Engines

Gallery

See also
 Oldsmobile Cutlass
 Oldsmobile Cutlass Ciera
 Oldsmobile Cutlass Calais
 Oldsmobile 442
 Oldsmobile Hurst/Olds

References

External links

 442.com
 Oldsmobile Club of America
  1970-1971 Cutlass Supreme SX registry
 1972 Oldsmobile "V Code" Registry (455/M20 cars)
 w-body.com
 GM W Body

Front-wheel-drive vehicles
Mid-size cars
Cutlass Supreme
Rear-wheel-drive vehicles
Coupés
Muscle cars
Sedans
Convertibles
1960s cars
1970s cars
1980s cars
1990s cars
Cars introduced in 1966
Personal luxury cars